Hagen (also Hagen am Teutoburger Wald) is a municipality in the district of Osnabrück, in Lower Saxony, Germany. It is situated in the Teutoburg Forest, approx. 10 km southwest of Osnabrück.

References

External links
hagen-atw.de the village homepage on the Web (in German)

Osnabrück (district)